Sérgio Manoel Barbosa Santos (8 September 1989 – 28 November 2016), known as Sérgio Manoel, was a Brazilian footballer who last played as a defensive midfielder for Chapecoense.

Sérgio Manoel was one of the victims when LaMia Airlines Flight 2933 crashed on 28 November 2016.

Club career
Sérgio Manoel was born in Xique-Xique, Bahia, but was raised in São Paulo. Joining Nacional-SP's youth setup in 2005, he made his senior debut in 2008 during the year's Copa Paulista.

On 7 April 2009, Sérgio Manoel joined , and became an undisputed starter for the side. The following year he moved to Batatais, but his spell was hampered by injuries.

In June 2011, after a period at Rio Preto, Sérgio Manoel signed for Série D side Mirassol. A regular starter for the side, he moved to Coritiba on 20 April 2012.

Sérgio Manoel made his Série A debut on 20 May 2012, coming on as a half-time substitute for Willian Farias in a 0–2 away loss against Internacional. He would struggle severely with injuries in the following campaigns, however.

On 28 January 2015, Sérgio Manoel agreed to a contract with Atlético Goianiense. Released on 30 July, he was announced at Goiás on 5 August, but the deal was declared void the following day after the highly negative response from the supporters.

Sérgio Manoel joined Paysandu on 10 September 2015, remaining at the side until the end of the year. On 11 December he signed for Água Santa, and impressed enough to secure a move to Chapecoense in the top tier on the following 19 May.

Sérgio Manoel scored his first goal in the main category of Brazilian football on 19 June 2016, netting the first in a 2–1 away win against Vitória.

Death
On 28 November 2016, whilst at the service of Chapecoense, Sérgio Manoel was among the fatalities of the LaMia Airlines Flight 2933 accident in the Colombian village of Cerro Gordo, La Unión, Antioquia.

Club statistics

Honours
Chapecoense
 Copa Sudamericana: 2016 (posthumously)

References

External links

1989 births
2016 deaths
Sportspeople from Bahia
Brazilian footballers
Association football midfielders
Campeonato Brasileiro Série A players
Campeonato Brasileiro Série B players
Campeonato Brasileiro Série D players
Nacional Atlético Clube (SP) players
Batatais Futebol Clube players
Rio Preto Esporte Clube players
Mirassol Futebol Clube players
Coritiba Foot Ball Club players
Atlético Clube Goianiense players
Paysandu Sport Club players
Associação Chapecoense de Futebol players
Footballers killed in the LaMia Flight 2933 crash